The Agnew Gold Mine, formerly the Emu Mine, is a gold mine located  west of Agnew, Western Australia. It is owned by the South African mining company Gold Fields. As of 2022, it is one of four mines the company operates in Australia, the others being the Granny Smith Gold Mine, St Ives Gold Mine and the Gruyere Gold Mine.

Ore is mined at Agnew in the under ground Waroonga complex and the open pit Songvang operation.

History

Gold mining at Agnew commenced in the early 1900s, with mining being carried out by East Murchison United, EMU, which gave the mine its original name, the EMU mine, as well as a company owned by Claude de Bernales.

Western Mining (WMC) acquired the mining tenements in the early 1980s, opening an open cut mine and process plant there in 1986, near the town of Agnew. At this point the town, which had once had a population in the thousands, just consisted of a run-down hotel, the near-by newly-established mining town of Leinster serving the Leinster Nickel Mine. When WMC acquired the Leinster mine in 1989 and renamed it Leinster Nickel Operations, the gold mine at Agnew became the Leinster Gold Operations, with both operations sharing a number of facilities.

In 1990, underground mining at Agnew commenced. In 1994, WMC restructured its organisation and separated the gold and nickel operations, with the gold mine becoming the Agnew Gold Operation. A second gold mine in the area, the Lawlers Gold Mine, was operated by Barrick Gold, until purchased by Gold Fields in October 2013.

On 13 June 1989 the mine, then called the Emu mine, was the scene of one of the worst mining disasters in Western Australia when six workers drowned in the underground operations during a flood.

The mine was purchased by Goldfields from WMC in late 2001. The combined price for the two Australian operations Goldfields purchased, St Ives and Agnew, was US$180 million in cash and $52 million in Gold Fields shares.

Agnew, in 2009, employed 114 permanent staff and 298 contractors.

A 4 MW solar farm was added in 2019, along with a 17 MW wind farm and a 13MW/4MWh battery, supplying half the mine's power needs.

Production
Annual production of the mine:

References

Bibliography

External links 
 
 MINEDEX website: Agnew - Emu Database of the Department of Mines, Industry Regulation and Safety

Gold mines in Western Australia
Underground mines in Australia
Surface mines in Australia
Shire of Leonora
Gold Fields